The friarbirds, also called leatherheads, are about 15 species of relatively large honeyeaters in the genus Philemon. Additionally, the single member of the genus Melitograis is called the white-streaked friarbird. Friarbirds are found in Australia, Papua New Guinea, eastern Indonesia, and New Caledonia. They eat nectar, insects and other invertebrates, flowers, fruit, and seeds.

The friarbirds generally have drab plumage. They derive their name from the circular pattern at the crown of their heads and their neutral coloring, which makes them resemble friars. In many instances, their plumage is mimicked by smaller orioles, which use the aggressive nature of the friarbirds to avoid aggression themselves.

Species
The genus Philemon contains the following extant species:

 Meyer's friarbird (Philemon meyeri)
 Brass's friarbird (Philemon brassi)
 Little friarbird (Philemon citreogularis)
 Grey friarbird (Philemon kisserensis)
 Timor friarbird (Philemon inornatus)  
 Morotai friarbird (Philemon fuscicapillus)
 Seram friarbird (Philemon subcorniculatus)
 Buru friarbird (Philemon moluccensis)
 Tanimbar friarbird (Philemon plumigenis)
 Helmeted friarbird (Philemon buceroides)
 New Guinea friarbird (Philemon novaeguineae)
 New Britain friarbird (Philemon cockerelli)
 New Ireland friarbird (Philemon eichhorni)
 Manus friarbird (Philemon albitorques)
 Silver-crowned friarbird (Philemon argenticeps)
 Noisy friarbird (Philemon corniculatus)
 New Caledonian friarbird (Philemon diemenensis)

Formerly, some authorities also considered the black-eared oriole (as Philedon bouroensis) a species within the genus Philemon.

References

 
Taxa named by Louis Jean Pierre Vieillot